Sotirios Kokkinis (born 11 July 2000) is a Greek-German professional footballer who plays as a left winger for Super League 2 club Chania.

Early years
Having been born in Preveza, Greece, Kokkinis grew up in Germany thus receiving German citizenship. He began his football career at the youth team of Borussia Mönchengladbach, and later transferred to VVV-Venlo Youth in the Netherlands. In 2014 he returned to Germany and joined Schalke 04, competing with the Youth and U-16 team until 2017, when he returned to VVV-Venlo. In 2020, Kokkinis transferred to Willem II, where he was part of the club's U-21 team.

Career
In January 2021, Kokkinis returned to Greece and signed his first professional contract with Super League 2 side Ergotelis.

Career statistics

Club

References

External links
 

2000 births
Living people
Greek footballers
Super League Greece 2 players
Super League Greece players
Ergotelis F.C. players
Ionikos F.C. players
Association football forwards
Footballers from Preveza